The Idaho Botanical Garden (IBG) is a nonprofit botanical garden located on  at 2355 North Old Penitentiary Road, Boise, Idaho, United States. Until 1973 the site served as the Old Idaho State Penitentiary's farm and nursery. After the penitentiary was closed, the land lay dormant for more than a decade, and in 1984 the gardens were first created. The facility is operated by a private, non-profit 501(c)(3) corporation. To help fund the garden, an admission fee is charged for entry.

Gardens
 English Garden - This garden, which opened in 1998, was designed by world-renowned English landscape architect John Brookes and was made possible by Muriel and Diana Kirk. It contains plants typical to English gardens, but plants that are specifically selected to perform in the local climate. More than 1,300 perennials have been planted in this garden.
A key focal point of the Muriel and Diana Kirk English Garden is the charming Summer House, constructed of Tablerock sandstone. The black slate roof originally graced the Veterans Home, and the ceiling is wood from the floor of Boise’s former J.C. Penneys store. The crowning achievement is the wrought iron and copper weathervane, crafted by Boise’s own master blacksmith Nahum Hersom. Another focal point is the Princess Diana Fountain, dedicated in 1998 in memory of Diana, Princess of Wales.
 Herb Garden - Flavorful and fragrant, the Herb Garden contains plants rich in legend and lore as well as aroma. These plants are herbs used for medicines, cosmetics, decoration, and cooking. This garden is one of the older gardens at IBG, established in the early 1990s. The stonework came from Boise’s Eastman Building which burned down in the 1986 downtown fire. 
 Idaho Native Plant Garden (completed 1994) - representative plants from Idaho's desert and woodland environments, including sagebrush, syringa, native dogwood, and Idaho fescue.
 Meditation Garden - mature trees planted in the 1930s and 1940s by minimum security prisoners at the old Penitentiary. The rock wall along the back border of this garden contains sandstone quarried from Table Rock by the inmates. Visit the Koi pond to see an array of Koi donated by Richins family.  The Richins donated their beautiful collection of Koi fish to the garden along with the funds to build a new state of the art Koi pond.
 Rose Garden - Heirloom and other old-style roses. Planted among the roses and along this garden’s borders are a host of popular perennials used to extend the seasonal interest of the garden. Jane Falk Oppenheimer, who, along with her husband Arthur, donated the funding to initiate this garden. Sandstone terraces reflect the contours of the Boise foothills and the rustic stone walls of the Old Penitentiary. It is one of IBG’s older gardens, opening in 1989.
 Children’s Adventure Garden - This space is designed for families and children to immerse in nature and play. Young explorers can crawl through hollow logs, ascend into the canopy of our tree house, or find shade under the stone lizard lair. Our “Boy in the Swing” fountain houses tadpoles, native tree frogs and water skippers. Bunnies, birds, and other wildlife can usually be found around every corner. Three Sensory Beds sit in the center of this Garden, where young children can experience new textures, amazing sights, and fascinating smells. Older children will enjoy the Kitchen Garden—tending to the vegetables, fruits, herbs and edible flowers that grow next to our miniature Kitchen Play-House. Kids can also learn about meat-eating (carnivorous) plants, Idaho geology, or simply enjoy the instruments of our musical trail. 
 Plant Select Demonstration Garden - Since 2012, IBG has showcased some of these plants in the Plant Select® Demonstration Garden. They became a licensed propagator in 2018, which allows them to grow plants for use in the garden and to offer them for sale to the public. Plants were chosen for the program to exhibit these eight attributes: Flourishes with less water, thrives in a broad range of conditions, is habitat-friendly, demonstrates resilience in challenging climates, considered one of a kind/unique, resists disease & insects, has long-lasting beauty, and is non-invasive.
 Vegetable Garden -  A self-guided tour and interpretive signage is present in this garden, and it features seasonally grown fruits and vegetables. Produce is donated to the City Light Women’s and Children’s Shelter. 
 Idaho Native Plant Garden - In partnership with the Pahove Chapter of the Idaho Native Plant Society, IBG developed the Idaho Native Plant Garden in 1990.
The objective is to demonstrate a selection of Idaho’s diverse flora and to educate visitors about our botanical heritage and the importance of native plants. This garden features an ever-expanding list of native grasses, forbs, trees, and shrubs, with a focus on plants that thrive in our high desert climate. A small pond and waterfall sit near the center of the garden and showcase a selection of native wetland plants. A petrified log found in the Owyhee Mountain Range, which was donated to the garden in 2015, reveals a layer of Idaho's biological history.
 Lewis and Clark Native Plant Garden - The Lewis and Clark Native Plant Garden opened in May 2006, commemorating the bicentennial of the Lewis & Clark Expedition (1804-1806).
The objective of this garden is to display a selection of plants that were collected during the expedition, with a specific focus on the 145 species collected between Great Falls, Montana and The Dalles, Oregon. A series of interpretive signs inform visitors about the significance of the expedition and how Native Americans contributed to its success. Ethnobotanical uses of the plants are also highlighted. Designed by Don Brigham Plus Associates, the Lewis and Clark garden is organized into four zones – Canyon, Prairie, Mountain, and Wetland. Each zone presents plants and other features that are characteristic of their respective ecological communities. The Gathering Place, which is located at the entrance of the garden, features a green roof planted with a selection of native forbs and grasses. The design of the Gathering Place was influenced by Thomas Jefferson’s Monticello and Native American kivas.
 The Western Waterwise Garden - Located within the boundaries of the Lewis and Clark garden, is a demonstration of drought-tolerant plants native to the western states and is meant to inspire visitors to include such plants in their home gardens. Cultivars of some of the plants collected during the Lewis and Clark Expedition are featured in the Western Waterwise Garden.

Special events
Idaho Botanical Garden hosts an array of seasonally appropriate, annual events. The most popular of which are Great Garden Escape, the Harvest Festival, and Winter Garden aGlow. The Garden also offers adult education classes through spring, summer, and fall. Children's programs include Nature Camps, Field Trip Tours, Garden Play Dates, Garden on the Road, and Education Trunks that are rented out to local schools.

See also 
 List of botanical gardens in the United States

External links 
Idaho Botanical Garden Official Site
Old Idaho Penitentiary Historic Site

Botanical gardens in Idaho
Non-profit organizations based in Idaho
Tourist attractions in Boise, Idaho
Protected areas of Ada County, Idaho
1984 establishments in Idaho